Clivia miniata, the Natal lily or bush lily, is a species of flowering plant in the genus Clivia of the family Amaryllidaceae, native to woodland habitats in South Africa (Eastern Cape, Mpumalanga and KwaZulu-Natal provinces) as well as in Eswatini. Given suitable conditions it grows into large clumps and is surprisingly water wise. It is also reportedly naturalized in Mexico. It is a popular plant for shady areas and is commonly seen growing in older established suburbs in most Australian states.  It is also popular in New Zealand, Japan, China and the US, particularly California.

Description
The showy, funnel-shaped flowers are produced in an umbel-shaped inflorescence, colored red, orange or yellow, sometimes with a faint, but very sweet perfume.

It is sometimes known in cultivation as "Kaffir lily" (a term considered extremely offensive in South Africa). The same derogatory name is also applied to the genus Hesperantha (formerly Schizostylis).

It contains small amounts of lycorine, making it poisonous.

The genus, Clivia, was named after the Duchess of Northumberland, Lady Charlotte Clive who first cultivated the plant in England and provided the flowers for the type specimen. The Latin specific epithet miniata means “cinnabar", the color of red lead, referring to the flowers.

Cultivation 
Like its relative C. nobilis it has gained the Royal Horticultural Society's Award of Garden Merit, along with the variety C. miniata var. citrina (confirmed 2017). In warmer sites, it can grow outdoors and is used in landscapes for its attractive evergreen foliage and showy flowers. This clump-forming plant spreads via rhizomes and is particularly suited for shady areas.

Cultivars include Clivia miniata 'Kirstenbosch Splendour', bred by Graham Duncan, which illustrates the cover of the Kirstenbosch centenary book (2013).

Gallery

See also
 List of poisonous plants
 List of plants known as lily

References

Bibliography

External links

 https://web.archive.org/web/20181103025333/http://cliviabase.co.za/
 http://www.blankees.com/house/plants/k_lily.htm
 http://www.plantzafrica.com/plantcd/cliviaminiata.htm

Amaryllidoideae
Flora of Southern Africa
Garden plants
Garden plants of Southern Africa